Bidu (also Romanized as Bīdū and Bidoo) is a village in Howmeh Rural District, in the Central District of Deylam County, Bushehr Province, Iran. At the 2006 census, its population was 349, in 68 families.

References 

Populated places in Deylam County